Paavo Nurmi Stadium is a multi-use stadium in Turku, Finland. It is currently used mostly for football matches and athletics meets. It holds 13,000 people and is named after the Turku-born runner Paavo Nurmi. Twenty athletics world records have been set at the stadium. John Landy broke the world records for the 1,500 m and the mile (1954), Nurmi for the 3,000 m (1922), Emil Zátopek (1950) and Ron Clarke (1965) for the 10,000 m, Viljo Heino for the one-hour run (1945) and the 20 km (1949), Matti Järvinen for the javelin throw (1932) and Charles Hoff for the pole vault (1925).

Paavo Nurmi Games, a track and field meet, is held at the stadium annually.

References

External links
 
Stadium records
 City of Turku – Paavo Nurmi Stadium

Football venues in Finland
Buildings and structures in Turku
Sport in Turku
Tourist attractions in Turku
Stadium